The 2010 Las Vegas Locomotives season was the second season for the United Football League franchise. They finished with a 5–3 record and defended their UFL Championship by defeating the Florida Tuskers, 23–20, in the 2010 UFL Championship Game.

Offseason

UFL draft

Personnel

Staff

Roster

Schedule

Standings

Game summaries

Week 1: vs. Florida Tuskers

Week 3: at Florida Tuskers

Week 4: vs. Omaha Nighthawks

Week 5: at Sacramento Mountain Lions

Week 6: vs. Hartford Colonials

Week 7: at Omaha Nighthawks

Week 8: vs. Sacramento Mountain Lions

Sacramento attempted to avenge a 26–3 home loss earlier in the season to Las Vegas and did so with a 27–24 win on the road at Sam Boyd Stadium. The Mountain Lions survived a scare after the Locos tied the game at 24 in the fourth quarter, after Sacramento lead 21–0 in the second. Chase Clement was stellar in his debut for the Locos, throwing a touchdown and running for two in Las Vegas's comeback attempt that came up just a bit short.

Week 10: at Hartford Colonials

References

Las Vegas Locomotives Season, 2010
Las Vegas Locomotives seasons
2010 in sports in Nevada